General elections were held in Swaziland in June 1964 to elect members of the Legislative Council. The result was a victory for the Imbokodvo National Movement, which won eight of the directly-elected seats and all eight Tinkhundla seats.

Electoral system
The elections were held using two voter rolls; a national roll elected eight Africans in "Open seats" and four Europeans from "Reserved seats" between 23 and 25 June, whilst a European roll elected a further four Europeans on 17 June. A further eight seats were elected by the Tinkhundla ("chiefdoms grouped for age regiment mobilisation").

Results

References

1964 elections in Africa
1964
Election
June 1964 events in Africa